Alfonso XII (Alfonso Francisco de Asís Fernando Pío Juan María de la Concepción Gregorio Pelayo; 28 November 185725 November 1885), also known as El Pacificador or the Peacemaker, was King of Spain from 29 December 1874 to his death in 1885. After a revolution that deposed his mother Isabella II from the throne in 1868, Alfonso studied in Austria and France. His mother abdicated in his favour in 1870, and he returned to Spain as king in 1874 following a military coup against the First Republic. Alfonso died aged 27 in 1885, and was succeeded by his son, Alfonso XIII, who was born the following year. He is the most recent monarch of Spain to have died while on the throne.

Political background, early life and paternity
Alfonso was born in Madrid as the eldest son of Queen Isabella II on 28 November 1857. His official father, Isabella's husband Francisco de Asís, has been generally viewed as effeminate, impotent or homosexual, leading writers to question his biological paternity. There is speculation that Alfonso's biological father may have been Enrique Puigmoltó y Mayans, a captain of the guard. The relationship of the queen with Puigmoltó was so much of a public hearsay at the time that Francisco de Asís initially refused to attend the baptism ceremony of Alfonso (the heir apparent) even if he was eventually forced to do so. These rumours were used as political propaganda against Alfonso by the Carlists, and he came to be widely nicknamed "Puigmoltejo" in reference to his supposed father. Others have assigned the fatherhood to Federico Puig Romero, a colonel who was murdered under unclear circumstances in 1866.

His mother's accession created the second cause of instability, the Carlist Wars. The supporters of the Count of Molina as King of Spain rose to have him enthroned. In addition, within the context of the post-Napoleonic restorations and revolutions which engulfed the West both in Europe and the Americas, both the Carlistas and the Isabelino conservatives were opposed to the new Napoleonic constitutional system. Much like in Britain, which subtracted itself from the liberal constitutional process, Spanish conservatives wanted to continue with the Traditional Spanish Organic Laws such as the Fuero Juzgo, the Novísima Recopilación and the Partidas of Alfonso X. This led to the third cause of instability of note, the independence of most of the American possessions, recognized between 1823 and 1850.

A split nation
When Queen Isabella II and her husband were forced to leave Spain by the Revolution of 1868, Alfonso accompanied them to Paris. From there, he was sent to the Theresianum in Vienna to continue his studies. On 25 June 1870, he was recalled to Paris, where his mother abdicated in his favour, in the presence of a number of Spanish nobles who had tied their fortunes to those of the exiled queen. He assumed the name Alfonso XII, for although no king of united Spain had borne the name "Alfonso", the Spanish monarchy was regarded as continuous with the more ancient monarchy represented by the 11 kings of Asturias, León and Castile also named Alfonso.

The Republic

After the revolution, the Cortes decided to set up a new dynasty on the throne. Prince Amadeo of Savoy, the younger son of King Victor Emmanuel II of Italy and a distant cousin of Alfonso by common descent from Charles III, was recognized as King of Spain in November 1870. During a tumultuous reign, Amadeo was targeted by assassination attempts and struggled with opposition from both Carlists and republicans while his own faction split. After the Carlists revolted and the Third Carlist War broke out, he abdicated and returned to Italy in early 1873.

Following Amadeo's abandonment, the First Spanish Republic was established, including the territories of Cuba, Puerto Rico and the Pacific Archipelagos. The first act of President Estanislao Figueras was to extend the abolition of slavery to Puerto Rico; Cuban slaves would have to wait until 1889. The republicans were not in agreement either, and they had to contend with a war in Cuba and Muslim uprisings in Spanish Morocco. In the midst of these crises, the Carlist War continued and the Carlist party made itself strong in areas with claims over their national and institutional specificity such as Catalonia and the Basque Country. This unrest led to the creation of a group in favour of the Bourbon Restoration, led by the moderate conservative Antonio Cánovas del Castillo. 

Alfonso was well-educated and cultured, especially compared to his mother. His tutors took great care to have him educated in good schools and to familiarize him with different cultures, languages and government models throughout Europe. During the Franco-Prussian War, Alfonso relocated from Paris to Geneva with his family, and then continued his studies at the Theresianum in Vienna in 1872. Cánovas began to take responsibility for Alfonso's education with the goal of shaping him into the ideal king for the planned Bourbon Restoration, and next sent him to the Royal Military College, Sandhurst, in England. The training he received there was severe but more cosmopolitan than it would have been in Spain, given its atmosphere at the time.

On 1 December 1874, Alfonso issued the Sandhurst Manifesto, where he set the ideological basis of the Bourbon Restoration. It was drafted in reply to a birthday greeting from his followers, a manifesto proclaiming himself the sole representative of the Spanish monarchy. At the end of 1874, Brigadier Martínez Campos, who had long been working more or less openly for the king, led some battalions of the central army to Sagunto, rallied the troops sent against him to his own flag, and entered Valencia in the king's name. Thereupon the President resigned, and his power was transferred to the king's plenipotentiary and adviser, Cánovas. The 29 December 1874 military coup of Gen. Martínez Campos in Sagunto ended the failed republic and meant the rise of the young Prince Alfonso.

Reign

Within a few days after Cánovas del Castillo took power as Premier, the new king, proclaimed on 29 December 1874, arrived at Madrid, passing through Barcelona and Valencia and was acclaimed everywhere (1875). In 1876, a vigorous campaign against the Carlists, in which the young king took part, resulted in the defeat of Don Carlos and the Duke's abandonment of the struggle.

Initially led by Cánovas del Castillo as moderate prime minister, what was thought at one time as a coup aimed at placing the military in the political-administrative positions of power, in reality ushered in a civilian regime that lasted until Primo de Rivera's 1923 coup d'état.  Cánovas was the real architect of the new regime of the Restoration.

In order to eliminate one of the problems of the reign of Isabel II, the single party and its destabilizing consequences, the Liberal Party was allowed to incorporate and participate in national politics, and the 'turnismo' or alternation was to become the new system. Turnismo would be endorsed in the Constitution of 1876 and the Pact of El Pardo (1885). It meant that liberal and conservative prime ministers would succeed each other ending thus the troubles.

This led to the end of the Carlist revolts and the victory over the New York-backed Cuban revolutionaries, and led to a huge backing both by insular and peninsular Spaniards of Alfonso. His government continued the operations of the Ministry for Overseas Affairs which began under his mother's reign. The ministry was responsible for the theft of indigenous human remains and artifacts throughout colonized lands from 1863 to 1899. To this day, the majority of the stolen bodies of indigenous peoples, some still displayed in Spanish museums, have yet to be returned to their ancestral lands.

Alfonso's short reign established the foundations for the final socioeconomic recuperation of Spain after the 1808–1874 crisis. Both European (the coastal regions, such as the Basque Country, Catalonia, and Asturias) and Overseas – Antilles and Pacific were able to grow steadily. Cuba and Puerto Rico prospered to the point that Spain's first train was between Havana and Camagüey, and the first telegraph in Latin America was in Puerto Rico, established by Samuel Morse, whose daughter lived there with her husband. Upon the American invasion of Puerto Rico, ten US dollars were needed to buy one Puerto Rican peso.

First marriage
On 23 January 1878 at the Basilica of Atocha in Madrid, Alfonso married his first cousin, Princess María de las Mercedes, but she died within six months of the marriage.

Second marriage and rule

On 29 November 1879 at the Basilica of Atocha in Madrid, Alfonso married his double third cousin, Archduchess Maria Christina of Austria. During the honeymoon, a pastry cook named Otero fired at the young sovereign and his wife as they were driving in Madrid.

The children of this marriage were:
 María de las Mercedes, Princess of Asturias, (11 September 188017 October 1904), married on 14 February 1901 to Prince Carlos of Bourbon-Two Sicilies, and titular heir from the death of her father until the posthumous birth of her brother
 María Teresa, (12 November 188223 September 1912), married to Prince Ferdinand of Bavaria on 12 January 1906
 Alfonso XIII (17 May 188628 February 1941). Born posthumously. He married Princess Victoria Eugenie of Battenberg

Alfonso had two sons by Elena Armanda Nicolasa Sanz y Martínez de Arizala (15 December 1849, in Castellón de la Plana – 24 December 1898, in Paris):
 Alfonso Sanz y Martínez de Arizala (28 January 1880, in Madrid19 March 1970, in Paris), married in 1922 to María de Guadalupe de Limantour y Mariscal
 Fernando Sanz y Martínez de Arizala (28 February 1881, in Madrid8 January 1925, in Pau, France), unmarried and without issue

In 1881 Alfonso refused to sanction a law by which the ministers were to remain in office for a fixed term of 18 months. Upon the consequent resignation of Cánovas del Castillo, he summoned Práxedes Mateo Sagasta, the Liberal leader, to form a new cabinet.

Death and impact

In November 1885, Alfonso died, just short of his 28th birthday, at the Royal Palace of El Pardo near Madrid. He had been suffering from tuberculosis, but the immediate cause of his death was a recurrence of dysentery.

In 1902, his widow Maria Cristina initiated a national contest to build a monument in memory of Alfonso. The winning design, by José Grases Riera, was constructed in an artificial lake in Madrid's Parque del Buen Retiro in 1922.

Coming to the throne at such an early age Alfonso had served no apprenticeship in the art of ruling. Benevolent and sympathetic in disposition, he won the affection of his people by fearlessly visiting districts ravaged by cholera or devastated by 1884 Andalusian earthquake. His capacity for dealing with men was considerable, and he never allowed himself to become the instrument of any particular party. During his short reign, peace was established both at home and abroad, finances were well regulated, and the various administrative services were placed on a basis that afterwards enabled Spain to pass through the disastrous war with the United States without the threat of a revolution.

Honours
  Spain: Knight of the Golden Fleece, 1857
 : Grand Cross of the Tower and Sword, 1861
  French Empire: Grand Cross of the Legion of Honour, March 1863
 : Knight of St. Hubert, 1865
 : Grand Cross of St. Charles, 7 September 1865
 : Grand Cordon of the Order of Leopold (civil), 20 February 1866
 : Grand Cross of St. Stephen, 1875
 : Grand Cross of the White Falcon, 1875
  Kingdom of Prussia: Knight of the Black Eagle, 13 June 1875
   Sweden-Norway: Knight of the Seraphim, 23 October 1877
 : Knight of the Elephant, 8 January 1878
 : Knight of the Annunciation, 4 February 1878
 : Grand Cordon of the Order of the Chrysanthemum, 11 September 1879
 : Stranger Knight of the Garter, 24 October 1881
 : Knight of the Rue Crown, 1883

Ancestry

See also
 Monument to Alfonso XII

Explanatory notes

References

External links

 Historiaantiqua. Alfonso XII; (Spanish) (2008)

 
1857 births
1885 deaths
19th-century Spanish monarchs
House of Bourbon (Spain)
Nobility from Madrid
Princes of Asturias
Restoration (Spain)
People of the Third Carlist War
Spanish infantes
1870s in Spain
1880s in Spain
Grand Masters of the Order of the Golden Fleece
Knights of the Golden Fleece of Spain
Grand Masters of the Order of Isabella the Catholic
Grand Crosses of the Order of Saint-Charles
Collars of the Order of Isabella the Catholic
Knights Grand Cross of the Order of Isabella the Catholic
Laureate Cross of Saint Ferdinand
Crosses of Military Merit
Grand Crosses of Military Merit
Crosses of Naval Merit
Grand Crosses of Naval Merit
Grand Masters of the Royal and Military Order of San Hermenegild
Recipients of the Royal and Military Order of Saint Hermenegild
Grand Crosses of the Royal and Military Order of San Hermenegild
Grand Masters of the Order of Calatrava
Knights of Calatrava
Grand Masters of the Order of Santiago
Knights of Santiago
Grand Masters of the Order of Alcántara
Knights of the Order of Alcántara
Grand Masters of the Order of Montesa
Knights of the Order of Montesa
Spanish captain generals
Captain generals of the Navy
Grand Crosses of the Order of Saint Stephen of Hungary
Extra Knights Companion of the Garter
19th-century deaths from tuberculosis
Collège Stanislas de Paris alumni
Graduates of the Royal Military College, Sandhurst
Deaths from dysentery
Infectious disease deaths in Spain
Burials in the Pantheon of Kings at El Escorial
Tuberculosis deaths in Spain
Navarrese titular monarchs